The Alfa Romeo 1900 is an automobile produced by Italian car manufacturer Alfa Romeo from 1950 until 1959. Designed by Orazio Satta, it was an important development for Alfa Romeo as the marque's first car built entirely on a production line and first production car without a separate chassis. It was also the first Alfa Romeo offered with left-hand drive. The car was introduced at the 1950 Paris Motor Show.

1900 Berlina and Sprint
The 1900 was offered in two-door or four-door models, with a new 1,884 cc (bore , stroke ), 4-cylinder twin cam engine. It was spacious and simple, yet quick and sporty. The slogan Alfa used when selling it was "The family car that wins races", not-so-subtly alluding to the car's success in the Targa Florio, Stella Alpina, and other competitions. In 1951, the short wheelbase 1900C (c for corto (Italian for short)) version was introduced. In the same year, the 1900 TI with a more powerful  engine was introduced; it had bigger valves, a higher compression ratio, and was equipped with a double carburetor. Transmission was a 4-speed manual on basic versions and 5-speed manual in Super Sprint version, the brakes were drum brakes. The 1900 had independent front suspension (double wishbones, coil springs and hydraulic telescopic shock absorbers) and live rear axle. The first of the 1900 came fitted with 6.00-16 Pirelli Stella Bianca, and then in 1952 moved to the radial 165HR400 Pirelli Cinturato.

Production at the company's Milan plant continued until 1959: a total of 21,304 were built, including 17,390 of the saloons.

The chassis was designed specifically to allow coachbuilders to rebody it, the most notable of which was the Zagato designed, 1900 Super Sprint coupé, with an improved engine and custom body design. The Alfa Romeo 1900M AR51 (or "Matta") is a four-wheel drive off-road vehicle based on the 1900-series.

Coachbuilt versions
Iginio Alessio, then general manager of Alfa Romeo, was concerned for the viability of the independent Italian Coachbuilding industry–the advent of the unibody chassis design was threatening to put the carrozzerie out of business. Alessio was also a personal friend of Gaetano Ponzoni co-owner of Carrozzeria Touring Superleggera, thus from 1951-1958 Alfa Romeo built five different variations of the 1900 unibody chassis specifically for independent coachbuilders.

Alfa Romeo gave official contracts to Touring to build the sporty 1900 Sprint coupé and to Pinin Farina to build an elegant four seat Cabriolet and Coupé. The availability of a suitable chassis led to many other coachbuilders to build versions of the 1900.

Carrozzeria Zagato built a small series of coupés with the unofficial designation of 1900 SSZ, designed for racing with an aerodynamic  lightweight aluminium body and Zagato's trademark double bubble roof.

One-off specials where numerous from the famous Bertone BAT series of aerodynamic studies, to an infamous sci-fi like Astral spider designed by Carrozzeria Boneschi for Rafael Trujillo the dictator of the Dominican Republic. There was a Barchetta or "Boat Car" made by Ghia-Aigle in Lugano Switzerland designed by Giovanni Michelotti at the request of a wealthy Italian who had two passions: the 'Riva' boats and a woman, his mistress, the car has no doors or windscreen wipers.

Below is a sortable list of coachbuilt Alfa Romeo 1900s.

1954 Alfa Romeo 1900 Sport Spider

In 1954, Alfa Romeo made two spiders and two coupés using similar chassis as the C52 Disco Volante. In Bertone, Franco Scaglione penned two unique aluminium bodies, a coupé and a spider. The coupé was known as 2000 Sportiva. It weighs  and has .

Engines

IKA Bergantin

Industrias Kaiser Argentina produced between 1960 and 1962 a car named IKA Bergantin in Argentina, the body and suspension was from the 1900 Berlina and engines were from the Willys line, the 4-L  and the 6-L .

Gallery of models

References

Notes

Bibliography

External links

Alfa Romeo 1900 Register

1900
Rear-wheel-drive vehicles
Cars introduced in 1950
Sports sedans
Coupés
Roadsters